A styrene monooxygenase (SMO; EC 1.14.14.11) is an enzyme that catalyzes the chemical reaction

styrene + FADH2 + O2 ↔ (S)-2-phenyloxirane + FAD + H2O

as the first step of the aerobic styrene degradation pathway. The product 2-phenyloxirane is also known as styrene oxide and can be converted by a styrene oxide isomerase (SOI) to obtain phenylacetaldehyde, which can be transformed into the key-intermediate phenylacetic acid by a phenylacetaldehyde dehydrogenase (PAD).

The enzyme belongs to the group of oxidoreductases according to the EC classification and is dependent on FAD as cofactor, thus it was classified as an external flavoprotein monooxygenase (designated as type E). It forms a two-component system with a reductase (StyB, StyA2B). The reductase utilizes solely NADH to reduce the FAD, which is then transferred to the styrene monooxygenase (StyA, StyA1). Two types of that enzyme are described so far: StyA/StyB (designated E1),  first described from Pseudomonas species, and StyA1/StyA2B (designated E2), first described from Actinobacteria. The E1-type is more abundant in nature and comprises a single monooxygenase (StyA) supported by a single reductase (StyB), whereas the E2-type has a major monooxygenase (StyA1) which is supported by fusion protein of a monooxygenase and reductase (StyA2B). The latter one is the source of reduced FAD for the monooxygenase subunits and has some side activity as a monooxygenase. So far all styrene monooxygenases perform enantioselective epoxidations of styrene and chemically analogous compounds, which makes them interesting for biotechnological applications.

References 

EC 1.14.14